Dionysius is a lunar impact crater that lies on the western edge of the Mare Tranquillitatis. It was named after Dionysius the Areopagite. To the southeast is the crater pair of Ritter and Sabine. Just to the northwest is the system of rilles designated Rimae Ritter. These clefts follow a generally northwest direction.

The rim of Dionysius is generally circular and shows little sign of wear. The crater possesses a small ray system with a radius of over 130 kilometers. The formation has a high albedo and appears bright when the Sun is nearly overhead during a full Moon. It is surrounded by a bright halo, with darker material farther out. Some darker deposits are in the form of relatively rare dark rays.

Satellite craters
By convention these features are identified on lunar maps by placing the letter on the side of the crater midpoint that is closest to Dionysius.

References

External links

Dionysius at The Moon Wiki
 Stratification in a Tranquil Sea, Lunar Reconnaissance Orbiter images of Dionysius
 
  - includes a couple of craters such as Dionysius

Impact craters on the Moon